"Your Smile" is a song by American singing duo René & Angela. Released on February 5, 1986, it was the third single from the duo's 1985 album, Street Called Desire. "Your Smile" was the duo's second number-one single on Billboard's R&B chart.  It was also a minor hit on the Billboard Hot 100 peaking at number sixty-two.  Along with the track "Drive My Love", "Your Smile" was a minor hit on the U.S. Dance chart, peaking at number forty-seven.

References

1985 songs
1986 singles
René & Angela songs
Angela Winbush songs
Songs written by Angela Winbush
Songs written by René Moore
Mercury Records singles
Contemporary R&B ballads
1980s ballads